is a Japanese professional footballer who plays as a midfielder for Ekstraklasa club Cracovia.

Club career

MFK Zemplín Michalovce
He made his Fortuna Liga debut for Zemplín Michalovce on 14 February 2021 against Pohronie.

Cracovia
On 12 July 2022, Oshima was announced as Cracovia's new signing, joining the club on a two-year deal.

References

External links
 Profile at Futbalnet 
 
 

1998 births
Living people
People from Hirakata
Association football midfielders
Association football people from Osaka Prefecture
Japanese footballers
Japanese expatriate footballers
FC Osaka players
MFK Zemplín Michalovce players
Slovak Super Liga players
Ekstraklasa players
MKS Cracovia (football) players
Expatriate footballers in Slovakia
Expatriate footballers in Poland
Japanese expatriate sportspeople in Slovakia
Japanese expatriate sportspeople in Poland